Hronek (feminine Hronková) is a Czech surname. Notable people include:

 Filip Hronek, Czech ice hockey player
 Jiří Hronek, Czech writer
 Petr Hronek, Czech footballer
 Tim Hronek, German freestyle skier
 Veronique Hronek, German alpine skier

Czech-language surnames